Nick Pollock (born November 22, 1967) is a Seattle-based singer, guitarist, and songwriter best known for his work with the grunge band My Sister's Machine. He has also played in various bands with other notable musicians, including Alice in Chains singer Layne Staley and Queensrÿche guitarist Michael Wilton. He graduated from Lindbergh High School in 1986.

Biography

Alice N' Chains
Around 1985-86, Pollock was invited to play guitar with the band Sleze, whose other members at the time were vocalist Layne Staley, bassist Jim Sheppard, and drummer James Bergstrom. Sheppard would leave to focus full-time on his main band Sanctuary, and he was subsequently replaced by Mike Mitchell. Eventually, Mitchell also left the band and founding guitarist Johnny Bacolas would rejoin the band on bass, and they changed their name to Alice N' Chains. The band recorded two demos and toured throughout the Seattle area for roughly one year before they broke up in 1987. Staley went on to join the band that eventually took the name Alice in Chains and became hugely successful. Alice in Chains guitarist Jerry Cantrell stated in an interview several years later that it was Pollock who first introduced him to Staley.

My Sister's Machine
After the break-up of Alice N' Chains, Pollock played for about a year in a funk band with some older musicians. In 1989, Pollock formed the band My Sister's Machine along with guitarist Owen Wright, bassist Chris Ivanovich, and drummer Chris Gohde. Since none of the other members had ever been a lead singer, Pollock got the job by default as their primary lyricist, scribbling many of his verses between customers while working at a gas station. They went on to release two studio albums, Diva and Wallflower. Pollock wrote or co-wrote every track off both those albums. Both albums were largely well received by critics. However, My Sister's Machine split up in 1994 after Elektra Entertainment folded the label they were under at that time.

In June 2010, the Layne Staley Fund announced that My Sister's Machine would be headlining the upcoming Layne Staley Tribute on August 21.

In 2017, Metal Injection ranked Alice in Chains (Staley's version) and My Sister's Machine respectively at number 1 and number 6 on their list of "10 Heaviest Grunge Bands".

Tanks of Zen
Following the break-up of My Sister's Machine, Pollock started another band called Tanks of Zen. In 2000, this band recorded a set of songs under the working title American Hangover. A music video shot in black-and-white was released for the song “Through the Red Lie”. It features all four members of the band at that time – Pollock, guitarist Tim Jones, bassist Steve Rehnstrom, and drummer Todd Marvin – performing in studio intercut with scenes of a man and a woman, portrayed respectively by Pollock and his friend Bobbi Maas Woods, fighting in a bedroom. Despite this, however, American Hangover has so far never been properly released.

In 2009, Tanks of Zen reemerged with Pollock fronting a new lineup that included bassist Dan Scott, drummer Mark Locke, and for a brief spell, second guitarist Matt Johnson. They also announced their plans to record a new set of songs under the working title Love's Gentle Maw, which has been described by the band as a concept album dealing in relationships. In 2011, Pollock announced on Facebook that Love's Gentle Maw was in the final stages of production and being mastered by Eric Janko and Eddy Schreyer, who were also involved in the production of Soulbender; Schreyer has also mastered or co-mastered Alice in Chains' first three releases Facelift, Sap and Dirt. The album was officially released on September 30, 2011.

Soulbender
In 2001, Pollock formed Soulbender with Queensrÿche guitarist Michael Wilton, guitarist Dave Groves, and drummer Wes Hallam. This group performed at the very first Layne Staley Tribute held in 2002, the year Staley died. With the addition of bass player Marten Van Keith, they released their self-titled debut album in 2004. Many observers have compared this album to Alice in Chains and Tool. Sefany Jones, a contributing editor of KNAC, listed the album among her Top 15 albums of 2004; it came in at Number Two. Pollock left Soulbender in early 2007 and was subsequently replaced by his friend Second Coming vocalist Travis Bracht. Around 2013-14, Pollock reunited with the original full line-up of Soulbender to record four new tracks to celebrate the tenth anniversary of their original release. These four track were released as part of a remastered disc titled Soulbender II.

The National Guard
In 2015, Pollock formed The National Guard along with Truly guitarist Chris Quinn (later replaced by James Chow), Minus the Bear drummer Erin Tate, and  bassist Nick Rhinehart, who previously worked with Pollock's former My Sister's Machine bandmate Owen Wright in the group Old Lady Litterbug. He also played bass for Jerry Cantrell as part of the touring band, which also included Queensrÿche guitarist Chris DeGarmo and Alice in Chains drummer Sean Kinney, for Cantrell's solo debut Boggy Depot. The National Guard have so far released put out two singles, "Inauguration Day" and "Wheel".

Other musical projects
In January 2010, Pollock guest appeared with a band called Sundance Crow, led by Irish guitarist Matt Hayward; Pollock sung on their track "Silvertongue". However, the band disbanded shortly after the recording and the release was shelved but the song itself has appeared online.

Discography

My Sister's Machine

Soulbender

Tanks of Zen

The National Guard

Other appearances

References

External links

Alice N' Chains members
American rock musicians
American rock guitarists
American male guitarists
American heavy metal singers
American male singers
Grunge musicians
Singers from Washington (state)
My Sister's Machine members
Place of birth missing (living people)
Musicians from Seattle
1967 births
Living people
Glam metal musicians
Guitarists from Washington (state)
20th-century American guitarists
Soulbender members
20th-century American male musicians